María Camila Lopera Valle (born 18 April 1995) is a Colombian rugby sevens player. She represented Colombia at the 2015 Pan Am Games as part of the Colombian women's national rugby sevens team. She was a member of Colombia's sevens team for the 2016 Olympics in Rio de Janeiro, Brazil.

In 2022, She captained Colombia at the Rugby World Cup Sevens in Cape Town.

References

External links 
 

1995 births
Living people
Female rugby sevens players
Rugby sevens players at the 2015 Pan American Games
Rugby sevens players at the 2016 Summer Olympics
Colombia international rugby sevens players
Olympic rugby sevens players of Colombia
Central American and Caribbean Games gold medalists for Colombia
Competitors at the 2018 Central American and Caribbean Games
Pan American Games medalists in rugby sevens
Pan American Games bronze medalists for Colombia
Rugby sevens players at the 2019 Pan American Games
Central American and Caribbean Games medalists in rugby sevens
Medalists at the 2019 Pan American Games
Colombia international women's rugby sevens players
21st-century Colombian women
South American Games bronze medalists for Colombia
South American Games medalists in rugby sevens
Competitors at the 2022 South American Games